Yellow tag may refer to:

 Yellow tag or color-tagged structure, a classification to represent the severity of damage or the overall condition of a building
 Yellow tag or aviation parts tag, a method used in US aviation industry to indicate a part's serviceability